Paul W. Semmel (born November 6, 1939) is a former Republican member of the Pennsylvania House of Representatives.

He is a 1957 graduate of Parkland High School in Allentown, Pennsylvania. He earned a degree in agricultural education from Penn State University in 1961. He completed some graduate work at Temple University.

Prior to elective office, he worked as a teacher in the Catasauqua Area School District for 15 years. He is owner of the Excelsior Dairy Farm in Schnecksville, Pennsylvania.

References

External links
 official PA House profile (archived)

1939 births
Living people
Republican Party members of the Pennsylvania House of Representatives
People from Lehigh County, Pennsylvania
Penn State College of Agricultural Sciences alumni
Temple University alumni
Educators from Pennsylvania
Farmers from Pennsylvania